Moondram Ulaga Por is a 2016 Indian Tamil-language dystopian war film written and directed by Sugan Kartthi. The film stars Sunil Kumar (Paalai fame)  and Akhila Kishore in the lead roles, with cinematography handled by Dheva, edits by Richard and music composed by Ved Shankar.

The film was dubbed into Hindi as Ek Aur Mahayudh by Goldmines Telefilms in 2018.

Synopsis
An Indian soldier must fight for his life after he gets captured by the Chinese enemy camp during a war between India and China. He faces many hardships but does not lose hope.
He tries to runaway from the prison but is recaptured by Chinese army. However, he kills the colonel of Chinese army too. But there’s Indian traitor in the Army who is planning everything.
After killing the colonel of Chinese army, he uses his phone to call home where he informs his wife that they are in danger, she too tells him that she is two months pregnant.
He also records that how china is planning economic war against India and sacrifice his life for the nation

Cast 

 Sunil Kumar as Major Saravanan
 Akhila Kishore as Madhivadhani
 Wilson Ng as Lim Bai Huai
 Avinash as Subramaniam
 Jeeva Ravi as Ravi
 Jennifer Antony as Saravanan's mother
 Sabari as Mugundhan
 Nafi as Dr. Nafi
 Hamsa
 Raj Kish
 Siva Ganesh as Kiran Nair
 Aravind as Robhindra Singh
 Karthick Rajendran as Pon Manickam

Production 
The film, focusing on the plot of a fictional war between India and China in 2025, was revealed to be approaching completion in September 2014. The director, Sugan, stated he was inspired by life in his village of Pallipatti in Dharmapuri, and his days in the National Cadet Corps, while scripting the film, while the film's shoot was completed within a period of 45 days. Sunil Kumar was signed to play the lead character as Major Saravanan, after the director was impressed with his role in Paalai. Akhila Kishore was signed on to portray a soldier's wife in the film. It took one year to complete the extensive CG work. The film's distribution rights were bought by Dream Factory in early 2016, increasing the financial viability of the project with good publicity.

Soundtrack 

The soundtrack album of Moondram Ulaga Por was composed by Ved Shankar and consists of three tracks sung by Shankar Mahadevan, Chinmayi, Shakthisree Gopalan and Ved Shankar, himself. Lyricist Annamalai has written all the songs in the movie while Sherief has done the choreography.

Release and reception 
The film opened to mixed reviews at the box office, with critics praising the lead actor's performance.

References

External links 

2016 films
2010s dystopian films
Indian war films
Films about social issues in India
Films scored by Ved Shankar
Films set in the 2020s
Films set in 2025
2010s Tamil-language films
Indian Army in films